Ban Chan is a tambon (subdistrict) of Galyani Vadhana District, in Chiang Mai Province, Thailand. In 2012 it had a population of 4,007 people.

Administration
The subdistrict is divided into seven administrative villages. The Ban Chan subdistrict administrative organization is the local government responsible for the subdistrict area.

References

External links
ThaiTambon on Ban Chan

Tambon of Chiang Mai province
Populated places in Chiang Mai province